The British Rapidplay Chess Championships was a rapid play chess congress held in the UK annually since 1986 (with the exception of 1993)until. Dec 20th 2022.It was  under the auspices of the English Chess Federation. but never was funded underwritten nor sponsored by the ECF . The UK's premier weekend rapidplay congress included The British Rapidplay Championship which was open to all players, and several grading restricted and junior tournaments. The tournament took place over two days and consisted of 11 rounds of chess . There were Open, Major, Intermediate, Minor and Junior categories. The event has been held in Leeds, Bradford and Halifax over the years.

 The Open winner in 2010 was Grandmaster (GM) David Howell, scoring 10½/11. 
 The 25th anniversary event took place at Leeds Metropolitan University, Headingley, Leeds on 19 and 20 November 2011. The Open winner was GM Gawain Jones scoring 10½/11 points. 
 The 2012 event took place again at the L.M.U. on 24 and 25 November. The winner was Jonathan Hawkins IM with 9/11.
 The 2013 event was played on 23 and 24 November at Leeds Metropolitan University, Headingley and was won by GM Mark Hebden with 9.5/11.
 The 2014 event took place on 1 and 2 November and saw Jonathan Hawkins G.M. win with 10.5/11. Leeds Beckett University was the venue and saw a good turnout in all the main events. The event saw its 20th consecutive year under the British Rapidplay Chess Organization - Secretary B.Kitson, Treasurer S.Burton, Website S.Forbes, Honorary President M.Dow.
 The 2015 event took place at Leeds Beckett University on 31 October and 1 November.
The Joint Winners were G.M. Mark Hebden and I.M. Ameet Ghasi .
 The 2016 event took place on 12 and 13 November 2016 at Temple Moor High School,Leeds
The Joint Winners of the thirtieth anniversary event were I.M. Lorin D'Costa and I.M. Richard A Bates on 9/11 .
  The 2017 event took place on 18 and 19 November at The Craiglands Hotel, Ilkley .
The winner of The Open was the Spanish G.M. Daniel Alsina Leal with 8/10....
  The 2018 event took place on 24 and 25 November at The Craiglands, Ilkley The winner was I.M.Gediminas Sarakauskas with 9.5/11
 The 2019 event took place in Pudsey Civic Hall on 23 and 24 November 2019 .The Joint Winners on 8.5/11 were Stephen J Gordon GM and David J Egglestone I.M.
 The 2020/21 event has been moved to Nov 26th-Nov 27th 2022 due to Covid19 and was due to  take place at..Trinity University Horsforth. It was however 
postponed in 2022 due to illness and ongoing COVID 
possibilities.The  website below is no longer being maintained as the ECF have taken back the auspices
and have demanded that the title British Rapidplay is no longer used ..The event is now under the ECF 4NCL BICC whose CEO is Mike Truran .It is now underwritten by the ECF.The organizers have  met and have retitled the event
The Shine UK Open Chess Rapidplay.The new event is 
open to all UK players.and should take place on Sunday 26th November 2023...It will be initially be a one day six round event ..the old event website below is defunct.It provides historical data still.

The new website is currently being formulated

British Rapidplay Chess Champions 
 1986 Nigel Short 
 1987 Nigel Davies 
 1988 Murray Chandler, Glenn Flear, Julian Hodgson and John Nunn 
 1989 John Nunn
 1990 Mark Hebden, Julian Hodgson, Jon Speelman and Alexander Wojtkiewicz 
 1991 Lev Polugaevsky and Jon Speelman
 1992 William Watson 
 1993  No Contest
 1994 Mark Hebden 
 1995 Michael Adams
 1996 Michael Adams
 1997 Stuart Conquest 
 1998 Keith Arkell 
 1999 Michael Adams
 2000 Aaron Summerscale and Ameet Ghasi 
 2001 Mark Hebden 
 2002 Peter Wells 
 2003 Peter Wells
 2004 Nicholas Pert
 2005 Mark Hebden 
 2006 Danny Gormally and Richard Palliser
 2007 Peter Wells
 2008 David Howell
 2009 David Howell and Mark Hebden
 2010 David Howell
 2011 Gawain Jones
 2012 Jonathan Hawkins
 2013 Mark Hebden
 2014 Jonathan Hawkins
 2015 Ameet Ghasi and Mark Hebden
 2016 Lorin D'Costa and Richard A Bates
 2017 Daniel Alsina Leal
 2018 Gediminas Sarakauskas
 2019 Stephen J. Gordon and David J Eggleston
 2020 No event due to Covid19
 2021 No event due to Covid19
 2022 No event due to Covid19 and Illness..
 2023 Event taken over by  ECF..

See also 
 Shine UK Open Rapidplay Chess .2023.

References

External links 

Chess national championships
Chess in the United Kingdom
1986 establishments in the United Kingdom
Recurring sporting events established in 1986
Annual events in the United Kingdom